A dollmaker is a maker of dolls.

Doll maker or Dollmaker may also refer to:
 Doll maker (Internet)
 The Dollmaker (1984), made-for-TV movie
 Dollmaker (comics), the comic book character
 The Dollmaker (novel), novel by Harriette Arnow